The Bone Shard Daughter is the first book in the Drowning Empire fantasy trilogy by Andrea Stewart. It is her debut novel, first published in 2020.

Plot synopsis 
The plot is split among the points of view of the various characters, winding from one to the next, and eventually connecting. The setting is an empire consisting of many floating islands upon the Endless Sea.

Lin is the daughter of the tyrannical emperor of the Phoenix Empire, but must compete to become his heir with Bayan, his foster son. The Sulai dynasty rules the empire by wielding bone shard magic, using skull fragments from their citizens to harvest their life force in order to animate constructs that fulfill various roles in running the island empire. Four major constructs that use hundreds of shards are the empire's ministers, while simpler constructs serve as dock clerks or spies. Lin is struggling to recover her memories, lost after contracting a mysterious illness brought to the palace by Bayan. She and Bayan vie to become the more adept bone shard magicians and thereby receive the emperor's favor. Because the bones must belong to a living person in order to work, the emperor gathers what he needs through tithing festivals, where the young members of his empire are trepanned, some dying in the process. Not all bone shard donors will power a construct, but those who do will have their life force drained and die early.

Jovis is a smuggler, who is on a mission to find and rescue his wife, Emahla, who was taken some years prior by a mysterious figure captaining a fast ship with blue sails. As he chases after this ship, he narrowly escapes the disaster of an entire island that sinks for no known reason, drowning and killing most of its inhabitants in the process. He rescues a young boy from the tithing ceremony along the way, and once upon the water, brings onto his boat a creature he mistakes for a kitten, whom the boy names Mephi. Jovis quickly gains a reputation as a rescuer of children, and is in much demand by desperate parents. As he is swept into this activity, ostensibly for the money lost in the island disaster rather than altruism, he discovers that since partnering with the fast-growing Mephi, he has developed super-human strength, which he uses against the imperial forces now hunting him with even greater intent than when he was a mere smuggler. Mephi, to Jovis' amazement, is able to speak, slowly developing from simple one-word concepts to using complete sentences. He finds himself torn between his original mission to rescue his beloved and his burgeoning commitment to doing what's right, a dilemma that is exacerbated when he finds himself cooperating with the rebels on Nephilanu Island, one of the empire's largest islands.

One of these rebels is Ranami. Ranami grew up as a "gutter rat", and is determined to change the system, and replace it with one that is more just. Her partner, Phalue, is the daughter of the wealthy governor of Nephilanu Island. Phalue, who had given up her philandering ways upon meeting Ranami, yearns only for Ranami to agree to marry her. She is unable to understand why Ranami continues to refuse her. Ranami is very clear that she has no desire to be a governor's wife. She is frustrated by Phalue's insistence upon defending the existing social structure, and how she parrots her father's philosophies. She begs Phalue to read relevant books on the subject, eventually dragging her into rebel business. Phalue agrees to help, but because she loves Ranami, not out of commitment to the cause.

As Lin discovers the secrets behind her father's power, she is shocked by his actions and becomes determined to gain the throne and change things for the better. Her actions lead to additional confrontations, eventually leading to her meeting with Jovis, who approaches the palace on behalf of the rebels, thus tying together the four narrative strands.

In a mostly separate narrative, Sand resides on Maila, a remote island. She doesn't do much, just collects mangoes. Other island denizens similarly collect clams, and gather daily in a central location to get their food. One day, she falls from a tree, and almost immediately begins to remember things, including a different life in a different place. The other island residents insist they have all always been on Maila, but Sand's awakening continues, and she decides to awaken the others as well. They figure out that they all arrived on the island on a ship with blue sails, whose captain is the only one who knows how to make it through the dangerous reefs into the harbor. They want to overpower the captain, but discover they are somehow conditioned to do no violence. As they work their way around this limitation, Sand realizes that this must mean they are constructs. They succeed in their efforts to seize the ship and map the way out, and at the close of the novel, Sand exclaims that she will sail away with them and make them into an army.

Characters 

 Lin: The resourceful and highly-intelligent heir-apparent to the throne of the Phoenix empire. She gradually comes to believe her father is unjustifiably harming the people of his empire, and is determined to gain the power to change things.
 Jovis: A smuggler turned child rescuer turned rebel; he is the swashbuckling, staff-brandishing "bad boy" who must elude both a powerful crime syndicate and the empire's soldiers, while deciding whether to pursue his own happiness or do what is right.
 Mephi: Starting out as a cute, kitten-like creature whom Jovis rescues, and a provider of entertaining repartee, Mephi develops into a central character with clear future significance to the continuation of the trilogy. He quickly grows in both size and communication abilities, and lends surprising powers to Jovis.
 Phalue: The daughter and heir of the governor of one of the empire's largest islands. Her relationship with Ranami, a commoner, is fraught with uncertainty and conflict because of their different world views.   
 Ranami: a commoner and freedom fighter at heart, she is now in a relationship with Phalue, and working to convince her of the inherent injustice of the hierarchical and exploitative social structure.
 Sand: A resident of Maila island, Sand spends her days placidly collecting mangoes, until one day she falls from a tree and hits her head. As she begins to recover memories she didn't know she had lost, she realizes she has not always been on the island, nor have the others there with her, and she sets out to awaken them and return to the empire.

Reception 
The reception was mostly positive. In her Locus Magazine review, Katharine Coldiron calls The Bone Shard Daughter "surprisingly complex", while noting that it "expends a lot of its energy on setup, it’s still a finely made book, its ideas sewn deftly together to make a beautiful garment." She commends the worldbuilding, themes, and characters, though she also observes that the language is not as compelling as it could be, and some characters and plot points are not fully in focus. In a glowing review, The Book Reporter claims that "brings together the best of fantasy, romance and science fiction, melding them into one glorious one-stop shop of speculative fiction." Adam Weller, writing for Fantasy Book Review, gave the book a score of 9/10, concluded that "The Bone Shard Daughter is full of surprises. It has a lot to say about our own society, as many great novels have the tendency to do. But it also pulls at your emotions through great character work, strong world-building, stomach-turning revelations, and hopeful paths toward the future. It a rich and rewarding novel, original and thought-provoking, and I didn't want it to end. One of the year's best."

S. Qiouyi Lu, writing for Tor.com, calls the worldbuilding of the novel "fascinating", questioning how no one had ever come up with a similar idea, and asserting that it was so good they found themself daydreaming about it long after finishing the book. More importantly, they write, the book explores three interrelated themes that feed into one another: empire, agency, and identity—especially as Stewart achieves from a pan-Asian cultural viewpoint and a post-colonial perspective. They appreciate the character development, and the unique and clever development of the bone shard magic of the Drowning Empire universe.

In a starred review, Library Journal opines that "multiple points of view combine with vivid worldbuilding and well-rounded characters, as the ramifications of authority based in fear impact an entire country".

Awards 
The Bone Shard Daughter was nominated for Goodreads Choice Awards for Fantasy and for Debut Novel (2020), the 2021 Compton Crook Award, and for a BookNest Award for Best Traditionally Published Novel (2020). In 2021, it was one of six novels nominated for a BFA in its Best Fantasy Novel category.

References

External links 

 Interview with Andrea Stewart

2020 fantasy novels
Debut speculative fiction novels
2020 American novels
2020 debut novels
LGBT speculative fiction novels
Orbit Books books